Thomas Ray Coon (March 4, 1854 - February 8, 1937) was a teacher and farmer from Hood River, Oregon who served two terms (1893-1896) as a Republican member of the Oregon House of Representatives from the 47th district (Sherman and Wasco counties), as well as serving as mayor of Hood River. He was a grandson of Paul Crandall, who had served in the Wisconsin State Assembly before migrating to Oregon.

References 

1854 births
1937 deaths
People from Hood River, Oregon
Mayors of places in Oregon
Schoolteachers from Oregon
Farmers from Oregon
Republican Party members of the Oregon House of Representatives